Hvožďany is the name of several locations in the Czech Republic:

 Hvožďany (Domažlice District), a village in the Plzeň Region
 Hvožďany (Příbram District), a village in the Central Bohemian Region